The 1976 PBA All-Philippine Championship was the third and last conference of the 1976 PBA season. It started on November 28 and ended on December 21, 1976. The Crispa Redmanizers and the Toyota Silver Tamaraws played for the sixth straight time in the finals.

The Crispa Redmanizers overcame a 0–2 series deficit to win over the Toyota Silver Tamaraws, three games to two, and became the league's first Grandslam champion.

Elimination round

Crispa defeated Noritake in a playoff match on December 9 for the right to meet Toyota in the championship.

Battle for third

Finals

Francis Arnaiz and Robert Jaworski took charge in finally applying the brakes on Crispa's last-ditch offensive, unleashing a telling 10–2 blast that gave Toyota an unreachable 97–86 lead, one minute and 30 seconds left. 

Francis Arnaiz banged in his team's last six points in overtime from an imposing 115–110 Crispa spread and insuring a Toyota victory with a clinching drive in the last five seconds that propelled Toyota on top, 118–115. Four Silver Tamaraws fouled out just before the extension period. The Silver Tamaraws blew a six-point lead in regulation, 106–100, with 1:30 left, the fighting Redmanizers level the count at 106-all on a split charities by Bernie Fabiosa that forces overtime.

A 5–0 blast in the last 60 seconds, four of them by Freddie Hubalde, put Crispa ahead and beyond recall, 115–103, after the Silver Tamaraws briefly threatened with five minutes left in the ballgame. Atoy Co sizzled with 34 points as he combined with Cyrus Mann, who hauled down rebounds and block shots. Though Francis Arnaiz fired 22 points for Toyota, Ramon Fernandez was limited to only 11 while Robert Jaworski finished with only seven points.  

A jumper by Cyrus Mann with 30 seconds left provided the Redmanizers the victory and sent the title series to a rubbermatch. The Silver Tamaraws rallied in the last two minutes from a 91–102 deficit. Crispa got their biggest lead of 14 points, 89–75, at the start of the fourth period on an 8–2 run with Atoy Co hitting two baskets and Mann and Philip Cezar combined for two points each. 

Fortunato "Atoy" Co rattled six straight points to give Crispa an 11-point spread at the half, 51–40. The Silver Tamaraws came back strongly in the third quarter with eight successive points to narrow the gap at 48–51. The Redmanizers did not panic and a 9–2 salvo gave them a 10-point lead quickly, 60–50.

The Redmanizers answered the Silver Tamaraws basket for basket and in the last two minutes, the Silver Tamaraws, demoralized by the impending defeat, lowered their guards completely, allowing Crispa to scored their biggest winning margin in the series.

Broadcast notes

References

External links
 Crispa-Toyota rivalry

All-Philippine Championship